Mennonite Brethren Centenary Bible College (MBCBC), Shamshabad, founded in 1920, is a ministerial training institution of the Conference of the Mennonite Brethren Churches in India, a Protestant Church Society headquartered in Jadcherla and is affiliated to the nation's first University, the Senate of Serampore College (University) {a University under Section 2 (f) of the University Grants Commission Act, 1956}with degree-granting authority validated by a Danish charter and ratified by the Government of West Bengal.

The MBCBC is among the four Theologiates operating in Telangana, promoting the vocation of Priesthood to take forward the Christian missions, with the other three being,
St. John's Regional Seminary (Theologiate), Ramanthapur (founded in 1926 in Nellore, Andhra Pradesh and relocated to Ramanthapur in 1965)
Andhra Christian Theological College, Secunderabad (founded in 1964 in Rajahmundry, Andhra Pradesh and relocated to Secunderabad in 1973)
Calvin Institute of Theology, Yacharam (founded in 2009 in Tamil Nadu and relocated to Yacharam)

Among these theologiates, St. John's Regional Seminary (Theologiate) is affiliated to the Pontifical Urban University, Rome, while the remaining three, which includes the MBCBC, are affiliated to the Senate of Serampore College (University), Serampore.

History

The Missions
The Mennonites initiated their Christian mission in Telangana with the arrival of Abraham and Maria Friesen in 1890 and worked together with the American Baptist Foreign Mission Society/Samavesam of Telugu Baptist Churches in Nalgonda.  Paul D. Wiebe writes that after they went and returned from a furlough in 1899, they began to work on establishing their first mission station in 1903 in Malakpet in Hyderabad.  After realising the need for theological education, the CMCBI began to send its ministerial candidates to STBC-Ramayapatnam Baptist Theological Seminary in Ramayapatnam.

Establishment of the Bible College
The year 1920 is attributed to the founding of the College in Nagarkurnool under the name Bethany Bible School which later on was moved to its present location in Shamshabad.  Over a period of time, the School was rechristened as Mennonite Brethren Bible Institute.  The Rev. S. Solomon in A Brief History of Mennonite Brethren Bible Institute recorded the movements of the College to various towns chronologically,
1920 in Nagarkurnool,
1921-1923 in Shamshabad,
1923-1929 in Nagarkurnool,
1930-1944 in Shamshabad,
1945-1952 in Devarakonda,
1952 to present in Shamshabad

It must be noted that even though the Church Society founded a seminary in 1920, it continued to send its ministerial candidates to STBC-Ramayapatnam Baptist Theological Seminary in Ramayapatnam until 1970, when it chose Union Biblical Seminary, Pune and later, CSI-United Theological College, Bangalore.  Finally, after gaining University affiliation in the 1990s, it began training its candidates within its Seminary for graduate education.

In 1969 when the Board of Governors of the Andhra Christian Theological College set up an internal curriculum revision committee to introspect their courses, the members of the Kretzmann Commission also visited the MBCBC for a field visit as part of their itinerary led by eminent ecclesiastical personalities who include, The Rev. M. L. Kretzmann, IELC, The Rev. K. Devasahayam, AELC, The Rev. A. B. Masilamani, CBCNC and The Rev. C. S. Sundaresan, CSI.

University Affiliation
Efforts were made by the Conference of the Mennonite Brethren Churches in India to affiliate the MBCBC with the Senate of Serampore College (University) ever since the College began offering B.Th. courses from 1989 onwards during the Principalship of The Rev. R. S. Lemuel, CMBCI.  It was in 1994 that the Senate Commission visited the College during the tenure of the University Registrar, the New Testament Scholar, The Rev. D. S. Satyaranjan who deputed the Church Historian, Bishop Emeritus J. W. Gladstone, CSI, the Systematic Theologian, The Rev. O. V. Jathanna, CSI and others followed by another Commission led by the Old Testament Scholar, The Rev. Gnana Robinson, CSI and the Systematic Theologian, The Rev. P. Kambar Manickam, TELC, who conducted an academic feasibility following the thorough affiliating regimen of the University and reported to the Senate of Serampore College (University).  Subsequently, the College availed the teaching of faculty from the nearest theologiate, the Andhra Christian Theological College for core subjects that included the Old Testament Scholar, The Rev. G. Babu Rao, CBCNC who took up teaching on an adjunct basis and from thereon with the full-time faculty on its rolls, the College built up itself up to the B.D. level.  In 1995, the College was provisionally affiliated to the Senate of Serampore College (University) and continues to be an important affiliated institution.

Academics

Course offerings
The MBCBC offers the following three courses, two of which are affiliated to the Senate of Serampore College (University).  For those taking up full-time vocation of Priesthood, the College offers full-time 5-year fully residential B. D. course with University affiliation for Christians of Protestant, Orthodox, Charismatic and the Small and Indigenous Churches.  A Diploma level course introducing Christianity is open for people of all faiths, also offered through the University.  In addition, the College has initiated a post-graduate diploma in peace studies under the seal of the College.

Faculty
The faculty of the MBCBC have a minimum of master's level qualification with teaching experience across affiliated colleges of the Senate of Serampore College (University) from various Protestant Church congregations.
{| class="wikitable sortable"
|+Mennonite Brethren Centenary Bible College Faculty (as per updated faculty list of the MBCBC uploaded by the Senate)
|-
! Discipline!!Faculty Name !! Gender!!Domicile!! HighestDegree !!Alma Mater!!University
|-
|English language||Ms. Christina LurdhamaniLaity||F||Telangana||M. A.||FPU, Fresno, CA (United States)||Fresno Pacific
|-
|Religion||The Rev. B. Gnana Manohar, AELC||M||Andhra Pradesh||M. Th.||ARRC, Hyderabad||Serampore
|-
|New Testament||The Rev. K. Balakrishnan, CSI||M||Tamil Nadu||D. Th.||UTC, Bangalore (Karnataka)||Serampore
|-
|New Testament||The Rev. K. Suraj Kumar, CBM||M||Andhra Pradesh||Ph.D.||University of Cape Town, Cape Town (South Africa)||Cape Town
|-
|Systematic Theology||The Rev. A. Shyam Rao, CMBCI||M||Telangana||M. Th.||||Serampore
|-
|Missions||The Rev. B. Jacob Dhinakar, CMBCI||M||Telangana||M. Th.||Gurukul, Chennai (Tamil Nadu)||Serampore
|-
|Old Testament||The Rev. K. Vijaya Kumar, CMBCI||M||Telangana||M. Th.||Faith Theological Seminary, Manakala (Kerala)||Serampore
|-
|History of Christianity||The Rev. Y. D. Jayaker, CMBCI||M||Telangana||M. Th.||FFRRC, Kottayam (Kerala)||Serampore
|-
|History of Christianity||The Rev. I. P. Asheervadam, CMBCI||M||Telangana||D. Th.||UTC, Bangalore (Karnataka)||Serampore
|-
|Religions||The Rev. R. N. Peter<ref>Minutes of the Meeting of the Working Committee of the Academic Council held on July 17, 2012, p.43.</ref>||M||||Ph. D.||||
|-
|Christian Ministry||The Rev. Devahi Selina, AELC||F||Tamil Nadu||M. Th.||UTC, Bangalore (Karnataka)||Serampore
|-
|New Testament||The Rev. Ch. Nehemiah Reddy||M||||M. Th.||||Serampore
|-
|Christian Ministry||The Rev. Tsuktitula||M||||M. Th.||||
|-
|Old Testament||The Rev. Lalfakawmi Pachuau||M||||M. Th.||||
|}

Library
The Library at the MBCBC is well stocked and has three sections and well maintained.  In fact, prior to becoming the Principal, The Rev. I. P. Asheervadam used to oversee the library.
 Main Library,
 Historical Library and Archives, and 
 Centre for Peace and Conflict Resolution Studies (CPCRS) Peace Library
Peter Penner writes that the missionary Ms. Emma Lepp who used to teach at the College was entrusted in 1962 with the task of consolidating the library acquisitions. During the later years, there have been overseas Librarians who have guided and helped in the maintenance of the library, which includes, Ms. Shirley Anne of Kansas.

The library is one of the oldest and continues to preserve archival holdings and was referred to by the Board of Theological Education of the Senate of Serampore College when it initiated the series Bibliography of Original Christian Writings in India in the 1990s during the incumbency of the Christian Theologian, The Rev. H. S. Wilson, CSI, the Christian Ethics Scholar, The Rev. Hunter P. Mabry, UMC and the New Testament Scholar, The Rev. Zaihmingthanga, PCI for which the Christian Theologian, The Rev. Ravela Joseph, STBC, and the Religious Scholar, The Rev. B. Suneel Bhanu, AELC were entrusted with the compilation in Telugu language. The library continues to be oft referred to by Scholars with the recent being the Systematic Theologian, James Elisha Taneti who also made use of the resources here in compiling History of the Telugu Christians: A Bibliography'' in 2011 for the American Theological Library Association.

Student Life and Annual Days
Enrolments at the College have been on an all-time high with the College getting affiliation status with the Senate of Serampore College (University) with candidates for Priesthood hailing from the Indian subcontinent as well as overseas candidates from the African continent.  At the end of every academic year, the College awards Diplomas to its students pending final University Degree which is awarded by the Senate of Serampore College (University).  For every College graduation, notable Theologians and Ministers with substantial pastoral experience have been delivering the graduation address.  In recent times, in 2016, it was the Homiletics Scholar, The Right Reverend K. Reuben Mark, Bishop - in - Karimnagar who delivered the graduation address.  For the College Annual Graduation of 2017, the new Bishop, The Right Reverend A. C. Solomon Raj, Bishop - in - Medak was invited to deliver the Graduation Address on 8 April 2017.

Succession of Principals since 1920
Since the founding of the Bible College in 1920, there have been many who led the College beginning with The Rev. Daniel F. Bergthold and down the line, The Rev. N. P. James became the first postcolonial Principal of the College.  One of the Principals, The Rev. Paul G. Hiebert was Fulbright Visiting Professor at the Osmania University during 1974-1975.

See also 

Education in India
Literacy in India
List of institutions of higher education in Telangana

References

Further reading

External links

Christian seminaries and theological colleges in India
Universities and colleges in Hyderabad, India
Educational institutions established in 1920
Reformed church seminaries and theological colleges
Universities and colleges affiliated with the Church of South India
1920 establishments in India
Seminaries and theological colleges affiliated to the Senate of Serampore College (University)
Universities and colleges affiliated with the Mennonite Church